Joseph Allen Farnsworth (born February 21, 1968, Holyoke, Massachusetts) is an American jazz drummer.

Farnsworth was one of five sons born to trumpeter and bandleader Roger Farnsworth; one of the brothers played saxophone in Ray Charles's band. He attended High School in Jakarta International School in Jakarta, Indonesia. He studied at William Paterson College, studying under Harold Mabern and Arthur Taylor and receiving his BMus in 1990. Following this he played with Junior Cook (1991), Jon Hendricks (1991), Jon Faddis (1992), George Coleman, Cecil Payne (1993 and subsequently), Annie Ross, and Benny Green (1995). He has played in the group One for All since 1995 with David Hazeltine and Jim Rotondi, and worked with Benny Golson, Steve Davis, and Eric Alexander in the second half of the 1990s. During that period he also played with Alex Graham (1995), Michael Weiss (1996, 1998), the Three Baritone Saxophone Band (1997), and Diana Krall (1999). He is now a member of Pharoah Sanders' band.

Discography

As leader
 Beautiful Friendship (Criss Cross, 1999)
 It's Prime Time (441 Records, 2004)
 My Heroes  (Venus, 2014)
 Time to Swing (Smoke Sessions, 2020)
 City of Sounds (Smoke Sessions, 2021)

As sideman
With Eric Alexander
Up, Over & Out (Delmark 1993)
Alexander the Great (HighNote, 1997 [2000])
Live at the Keynote (Video Arts, 1999)
The First Milestone (Milestone, 1999)
The Second Milestone (Milestone, 2000)
Summit Meeting (Milestone, 2001)
Nightlife in Tokyo (Milestone, 2002)
Dead Center (HighNote, 2004)
Sunday in New York (Venus, 2005)
It's All in the Game (HighNote, 2005)
Temple of Olympic Zeus (HighNote, 2007)
Revival of the Fittest (HighNote 2009)
Chim Chim Cheree (Venus, 2009)
Don't Follow the Crowd (HighNote, 2010)
Touching (HighNote, 2012)
Chicago Fire (HighNote, 2013)
The Real Thing (HighNote, 2015)
Second Impression (HighNote, 2016)
With Junior Cook
You Leave Me Breathless (SteepleChase, 1991)
With Steve Davis
Dig Deep (Criss Cross, 1996)
Crossfire (Criss Cross, 1997)
Vibe Up (Criss Cross, 1998)
Portrait in Sound (Stretch, 2000)
Systems Blue (Criss Cross, 2001)
Update (Criss Cross, 2006)
Eloquence (JLP, 2009)
Say When (Smoke Sessions, 2015)
With Benny Golson
Tenor Legacy (Arkadia Jazz, 1996 [1998])
Remembering Clifford (Milestone, 1998)
One Day, Forever (Arkadia Jazz, 1996 [2001])
With Mike LeDonne 
Smokin' Out Loud (Savant, 2004)
Night Song (Savant, 2005)
With Brian Lynch
Brian Lynch Meets Bill Charlap (Sharp Nine, 2004)
With Harold Mabern
Don't Know Why (Venus, 2003)
Mr. Lucky (HighNote, 2012)
Live at Smalls (Smalls Live)
Right on Time (Smoke Sessions)Afro Blue (Smoke Sessions)The Iron Man: Live at Smoke (Smoke Sessions, 2018)Mabern Plays Mabern (Smoke Sessions, 2018)Mabern Plays Coltrane (Smoke Sessions, 2018)
With Cecil PayneCerupa (Delmark, 1993 [1995])Scotch and Milk (Delmark, 1997)Payne's Window (Delmark, 1999)
With Pharoah Sanders
 The Creator Has a Master Plan (Venus, 2003)
With Jesse van RullerHere and There (Criss Cross, 2002)
With Cedar WaltonOne Flight Down (HighNote, 2006)

References
Gary W. Kennedy, "Joe Farnsworth". Grove Jazz'' online.
[ Joe Farnsworth] at Allmusic
One for All at AllMusic

American jazz drummers
Jazz musicians from Massachusetts
1968 births
Living people
20th-century American drummers
American male drummers
20th-century American male musicians
American male jazz musicians
One for All (band) members
Criss Cross Jazz artists
Venus Records artists
Smoke Sessions Records artists